Cyprus International Short Film Festival, best known as International Short Film Festival of Cyprus (ISFFC) is an international film festival for short films held in Cyprus. The festival is also European Film Awards-qualifying for short films.

Inauguration
In its inauguration year of 2008, the festival received over 300 submissions from 39 different countries. The jury was composed of the Greek Cypriot film director Panicos Chrysanthou, Turkish Cypriot film director Dervis Zaim, Russian journalist Simon Ostrovsky, and the Turkish actress Demet Evgar.

References

Film festivals in Cyprus
Short film festivals